Bears Park is a baseball stadium in Icheon, South Korea. The stadium is used by the farm team of the Doosan Bears.

Baseball venues in South Korea
Doosan Bears
Sports venues in Gyeonggi Province
1983 establishments in South Korea
Sports venues completed in 1983
Buildings and structures in Icheon
20th-century architecture in South Korea